Versowood Areena is an indoor arena in Heinola, Finland.  The arena was built in 1984 and has a capacity of 2975 where 1500 can be seated and 1475 can stand. It is the home arena for Peliitat Heinola of the Mestis hockey league the second top league in Finland behind Liiga and all other ice hockey teams in the city. It is also the home arena for Tinatuopit of 2. Divisioona.

History
Construction of the arena lasted from 1983 to 1984. The first match played was a test match friendly between the international squads Sweden and Finland which drew in a full crowd. The ceiling also holds the jerseys of Heinola greats Marko Nyman and Vesa Welling whose numbers 16 and 19 were retired by the team.

References

Indoor arenas in Finland
Indoor ice hockey venues in Finland
Sport in Heinola